Dr. Jenő Pongrácz (27 November 1852 – 9 August 1933) was a Hungarian jurist, who served as Crown Prosecutor of Hungary from 1910 to 1923.

References
 Révai Lexikon (vol. XV)

1852 births
1933 deaths
Hungarian jurists
People from Plášťovce